Wichterle & Kovářik was a Czechoslovakian machinery manufacturer based in Prostějov. They produced cars and trucks from 1925 to 1937.

Development 
František Wichterle founded a small factory in Prostějov, 1878 where he built agricultural vehicles. Dr František Kovařík owned a similar company in the same town who produced similar machinery. On 22 December 1918, the two companies merged into a joint-stock company Wichterle & Kovářik Ltd. After experimenting with different prototype, including buying a chassis from Italian engineering company Ansaldo, mass production did not begin until 1925 (or 1927 according to some sources) with the model 7/28. Production of the cars were discontinued in 1937 and continued producing small trucks until 1940 after the German occupation of Czechoslovakia during World War 2.

Models

Prototypes 
The first vehicle that was built under license of Ansaldo, only five prototypes were made from 1922. They had a four-cylinder four-stroke engine with a 1000cc displacement but later increased to 1250cc and then 1350cc. They later experiment making a more powerful and better equipped car with displacement of up to 1500cc.  From 1924 and Spring of 1925, around 5 4/16 hp (1250cc) prototypes were developed and produced. By the end of 1925, 15 5/20 hp (1350cc) prototypes were produced.

7/28 
The first mass production model. Produced from 1925 (or 1927) to 1932 with 280 examples built. Powered by a 1478cc four-cylinder engine offering 28 hp or 40 hp. The engine had hardened cylinder barrels, silumin engine block, 12V battery ignition and dry disc clutch. It had a top speed of 44 mph. During it production, several body type were offered, including an open tourer, faux cabriolet and limousine. They also made a two-seater sport model called the 7/28 Sport.

35 
Built from 1930 to 1935, 150 examples were built. The 1743cc four-cylinder engine produced 35 hp. It was offered in a four-seater phaeton, four- or six-seater limousine, open tourer, cabriolet or a landaulet body.

In 1931, they experimented with streamlining by fitting an aerodynamic body on a Type 35 chassis. Mass production were planned but setbacks caused it to never happen. Despite being well received by the press, the public wasn't ready for it. It was also expensive to produced and the performance and fuel consumption was lacklustre. Only 6 examples were made.

40 
The Model 40 was Wikov's most successful model. From 1933 to 1935, 330 examples were produced. The 1942cc four-cylinder engine produced 43 hp. It had a choice of two bodies, a four- or six-seater saloon. It was Wikov's most successful production model, of which 330 were produced.

In 1934, Czech racer, Adolf Szczyzycki won the 1000 mil československých (1000 Miles of Czechoslovakia) in the 2000cc class using a Wikov 40.

70 
The Model 70 was the largest model. Only four prototypes were produced from 1933 to 1935. It combined two four-cylinder engines borrowed from the Model 35 which resulted in a 3486cc eight-cylinder engine producing 70 hp.

Literature 
 Harald H. Linz, Halwart Schrader: Die große Automobil-Enzyklopädie. BLV, München 1986, ISBN 3-405-12974-5.
 Adolf Kuba, Milan Spremo: Atlas našich automobilů. 1929-1936. Nadas, 1989, ISBN 80-7030-049-3.
 Oldtimer Markt. Issue 07/1989.

External links 
 www.wikov.cz (German)
 Historie automobilky Wikov (Czech)
 Prostějovské továrny na stroje Wichterle a Kovářík a.s. (Czech)

References 

Motor vehicle manufacturers of Czechoslovakia
Defunct motor vehicle manufacturers of Czechoslovakia
Vehicle manufacturing companies established in 1922
Vehicle manufacturing companies disestablished in 1937